Edward John Belfour (born April 21, 1965) is a Canadian former professional ice hockey goaltender. Belfour was born in Carman, Manitoba and grew up playing hockey. He played junior hockey for the Winkler Flyers before going to the University of North Dakota where he helped the school win the NCAA championship in the 1986–87 season. The following year, Belfour signed as a free agent with the Chicago Blackhawks (after not being picked in the draft) alternating time between them and the Saginaw Hawks of the International Hockey League. Many regard Belfour as an elite goaltender and one of the best of all-time. His 484 wins rank fifth all-time among NHL goaltenders.  Belfour was inducted into the Hockey Hall of Fame in the 2011 class, his first year of eligibility. In addition Belfour is one of only two players to have won an NCAA championship, an Olympic Gold medal, and a Stanley Cup (the other such player is Neal Broten).

His characteristic face mask earned him the sobriquet "Eddie the Eagle", and some of his quirks and off-ice antics earned him the nickname "Crazy Eddie". After wearing #30 for his tenure with the Blackhawks, Belfour switched to #20 while a member of the San Jose Sharks as a tribute to Vladislav Tretiak, his goaltending coach and mentor from the Blackhawks. He would wear this for the rest of his playing career.

Playing career

Juniors and college
Belfour played for three seasons in the Manitoba Junior Hockey League with the Winkler Flyers, helping the team to a first-place finish in 1986. As the starting goalie for the top team, Belfour finally received some notoriety and he joined the North Dakota Fighting Sioux for the 1986–87 season. The 21-year-old Belfour was a freshman, older than many of the upper-classmen on his team. He won 29 games that year, helping UND set a new NCAA record with 40 wins on the year and win the National Title. After the season Belfour, as an undrafted player, was able to sign with any team and signed with the Chicago Blackhawks.

Minors and International
For his first professional season, Belfour played for the Saginaw Hawks of the IHL. He won 32 games for the team and helped them reach the IHL semifinals. The following season saw Belfour split his time between the IHL and NHL, playing 23 games with the parent club. He was returned to Saginaw where he helped the team to a 2nd-place finish in the conference but faltered in the postseason and the Hawks were bounced in the first round.

Rather than return to Saginaw, Belfour played the 1989–90 season with the Canadian national men's hockey team. He was recalled by the Blackhawks for their postseason run and produced a 4–2 record with a 2.49 GAA, far better numbers than the other two Blackhawk netminders.

Chicago Blackhawks
The next season, 1990–91, Belfour became the starting goalie, and had a strong rookie season. He notched 43 victories in 74 games (both NHL rookie and Blackhawk team records), finished the season with a 2.47 GAA and 4 shutouts. He also led the league in Save% (.910). It was the last time a goalie led the league in Wins, Save%, and GAA until Carey Price achieved the feat in the 2014–2015 season. For his success, he received the Calder Memorial Trophy for outstanding play by a rookie, and is the first person to receive the award under the Makarov Rule because he was a year under the new cutoff age of eligibility (26), the Vezina Trophy for best goaltender and the William M. Jennings Trophy for fewest team goals-against. He was also a finalist for the Hart Memorial Trophy as the league's most valuable player, the first rookie goaltender to do so. He would win the Vezina Trophy and Jennings Trophy again in 1993, and the Jennings Trophy once more with Chicago in 1995.

Belfour helped lead the Blackhawks to the Stanley Cup Finals in the 1991–92 season, where they lost in 4 games to the Pittsburgh Penguins.

However, by the 1995–96 season, tension was forming between Belfour and backup goalie Jeff Hackett, very similar to the tension between Belfour and his former backup, Dominik Hašek, which led to Hašek's trade to Buffalo. Belfour was traded to the San Jose Sharks midway through the 1996–97 season after turning down a contract extension from the Hawks.

Belfour finished his tenure with the Blackhawks ranking among the team leaders in many goaltending categories. Belfour finished third among all Blackhawk goalies in games played (415) and wins (201) in both categories ranking behind Hall of Famers Tony Esposito and Glenn Hall. Belfour also ranks fourth in shutouts (30), and second in assists (17). Belfour easily ranks as the Blackhawks' goalie leader in penalty minutes, with 242. Esposito, who played in more than twice as many games and minutes as Belfour, had only 31.

Faced with losing Ed Belfour as an unrestricted free agent on July 1, 1997, the Chicago Blackhawks traded Belfour to the San Jose Sharks on January 25, 1997 for right wing Ulf Dahlén, defenseman Michal Sýkora, goalie Chris Terreri, and a conditional second-round draft pick in the 1998 NHL Entry Draft.

San Jose Sharks and Dallas Stars
Following a dismal half-season with the Sharks, Belfour signed as a free agent with the Dallas Stars on July 2, 1997. During the season, Belfour played 61 games and had a 1.88 GAA as his team won the Presidents' Trophy and made it to the Western Conference Finals only to lose to the Detroit Red Wings.

The next season, the Stars repeated their regular season championship and Belfour won his fourth William M. Jennings Trophy. In the playoffs, Belfour won duels against past Vezina- and Stanley Cup-winning goaltenders Grant Fuhr and Patrick Roy, respectively. The Stars won the Stanley Cup, beating the Buffalo Sabres in six games, capped by an incredible goalie duel against former backup Dominik Hašek that ended in a 2–1 win in the third overtime. Belfour made 53 saves to Hašek's 50, and for the entire Finals, had a 1.26 GAA to Hašek's 1.68.

Belfour backstopped his team to another consecutive finals appearance, winning his second seven-game Western Conference final duel against the Colorado Avalanche's Patrick Roy. The Stars lost the Cup in double-overtime to the New Jersey Devils. Belfour had 4 shutouts in that playoffs, including a triple-overtime blanking of the Devils in game five of the finals series.

During the 2001–02 season, the Stars began to play poorly and there was a falling out between then-Stars coach Ken Hitchcock and GM Bob Gainey. After a poor season, the Stars decided not to re-sign Belfour and named Marty Turco the starting goalie for the next season.

Toronto Maple Leafs
On July 2, 2002, Belfour signed as a free agent with the Toronto Maple Leafs after then Leafs goaltender, Curtis Joseph, chose to sign with the Detroit Red Wings. Belfour rebounded after a dismal season with the Stars, winning a franchise-record 37 games and helping his new team finish second in the Northeast Division. His 2.26 GAA ranked 11th in the league. During the season, he was invited to play in the mid-season All-Star Game in Florida, but a back injury forced him to miss the event. On April 1, he earned his 400th career win in a match against the Devils. In the playoffs, Belfour posted a 2.71 GAA and a .915 Save% in seven games in an opening-round loss to the Flyers. On April 16 in Game Four at the Air Canada Centre, Ed made 72 saves before losing 3–2 on an overtime goal by Mark Recchi. Belfour finished as runner-up for the Vezina Trophy, won that year by the Devils' Martin Brodeur.

In 2003–04, he posted a 34-19-6 record in 59 games as the Maple Leafs finished fourth overall in the conference standings. He recorded a 2.13 GAA and a .918 save percentage along with ten shutouts. On April 3 in the final game of the season, Belfour posted a 6–0 shutout over the Senators to secure home ice advantage in the opening round of the playoffs. That shutout gave him 10 on the season, setting a new personal best. In the playoffs, Belfour posted three shutouts in the opening round against the Senators, setting a record for shutout streaks in a series.  However, in the second round, former teammate Jeremy Roenick eliminated the Leafs by putting a game 6 overtime goal past Belfour.

Belfour did not play during the NHL lockout in 2004–05, instead taking a minority stake in the projected Dallas Americans team in the proposed revival of the World Hockey Association while recovering and rehabilitating himself from primarily back-related injuries. The team had folded by October, 2004.

On November 28, 2005, Belfour won his 447th career NHL game, moving him into a tie with Terry Sawchuk for 2nd place in career wins. Ed made 34 saves in the 2–1 win over the Florida Panthers.

On December 19, 2005, Belfour moved past Sawchuk with a 9–6 win over the New York Islanders at the Air Canada Centre. He was honoured in a special pre-game ceremony on December 23, 2005, before a game against the Boston Bruins at the Air Canada Centre; the Leafs went on to win the game. At the end of the 2005/06 season, Belfour had a record of 457-303-111 in the regular season, and 88–68 in the playoffs.

On July 1, 2006, Maple Leafs General Manager John Ferguson, Jr. released Belfour to free agency after a lacklustre 22-22-4 record and a 3.29 GAA.

Florida Panthers
On July 25, Belfour signed with the Florida Panthers. In October 2006, Alex Auld was injured while the two goalies were horsing around. On February 13, 2007, Belfour tied Hall of Famer Tony Esposito for eighth place on the career shutout list with his 76th in the Panthers' 1-0 blanking of the Montreal Canadiens. Later in the season, another injury to Alex Auld gave Belfour the chance to become starter. He started 27 consecutive games, a record for the Panthers.  Belfour regained his form during the  season by posting a 2.79 GAA, .902 save percentage, and 1 shutout in 57 games.

Leksands IF
On August 27, 2007, it was announced that Belfour would play with Leksands IF in the Swedish second division. (HockeyAllsvenskan). Belfour's signing created much fanfare in the following months. He played his first professional game outside of North America in 18 years on October 31, 2007 with a 4–1 win over Sundsvall. Belfour followed up this game with a shutout streak lasting for 251 minutes, a club record in Leksand. He also broke the record for most shutouts during a whole season with 7.

During the division round, Belfour had a GAA of 1.79, which was the best of all goalies in Allsvenskan. During the playoffs, he had a GAA of 2.59 and a save percentage of .911.

Eagle mask
Throughout his career, Belfour has worn masks featuring an eagle on either side of his helmet. When asked why an eagle, he stated "I've always liked the eagle as a bird. It is a strong figure representing individuality, leadership, confidence, and outstanding vision. Its hunting and aggression are characteristics I admire, so when I was thinking of what I wanted on my mask, the eagle was a natural choice". Belfour's eagle has changed dramatically, from a rough Native looking style in Chicago, to a fierce competitive image in Dallas, while the background always features his current team's colours. On the chin, there is an image of the logo for the Make-a-Wish Foundation, a charity very close to his heart, and the back plate highlights his passion for speed and restored cars. The car on the back is a 1941 Willys, along with the words Carman Racing, which is the name of Belfour's car customization and restoration shop in Freeland, Michigan. Upon seeing Belfour's eagle mask for the first time, Mike Keenan, his head coach when he started in the NHL, nicknamed him "The Eagle".

International play
Belfour was selected to represent Canada at the 1991 Canada Cup Championship as the backup goaltender and was included in the squad for the 2002 Winter Olympic Team. In February 2002, Belfour won an Olympic gold medal with the Canadian men's hockey team. Although he didn't play in any of the Olympic Games in Salt Lake City, he did add depth in goal to the strong Canadian team backing up Curtis Joseph and Martin Brodeur.

Personal life
Belfour is an accomplished tri-athlete in his spare time, collects and rebuilds classic cars, and holds a private pilot's license.

Early in the 2000–01 season, on October 20, Belfour plead guilty to a misdemeanor charge in which Belfour was subdued by police after a woman he was with became frightened by an intoxicated Belfour in a Dallas hotel room. While under arrest and being transported to the local division, he allegedly offered Dallas police officers $1 billion for his release without charges. He apologized to the Dallas Stars organization and police officers involved and was fined $3000 for resisting arrest.

Late in the 2006–07 season, Belfour, along with Panthers teammate Ville Peltonen, was arrested on April 9 outside of a South Florida nightclub and was charged with disorderly intoxication and resisting an officer without violence. He was released the same day from Miami-Dade County jail on $1,500 bond.

On January 28, 2020, Belfour was arrested and booked into the Warren County Regional Jail after an early morning incident at the Kentucky Grand Hotel and Spa in downtown Bowling Green, Kentucky.  Belfour was charged with third-degree criminal mischief and alcohol intoxication in a public place.  Belfour damaged hotel property, and was "manifestly under the influence of alcohol to a point he was a danger to himself and others," according to the police report.

In his post-playing career he was inducted as a member of Manitoba Sports Hall of Fame  The Manitoba Junior Hockey League also awards a trophy named after Belfour to its top goaltender each season.

Career statistics

Awards and honours

See also
List of NHL goaltenders with 300 wins

References

External links
 
 Ed Belfour at HockeyGoalies.org
 
 
 

1965 births
Living people
Calder Trophy winners
Canadian expatriate ice hockey players in Sweden
Canadian ice hockey coaches
Canadian ice hockey goaltenders
Canadian people of French descent
Chicago Blackhawks players
Dallas Stars players
Florida Panthers players
Hockey Hall of Fame inductees
Ice hockey people from Manitoba
Leksands IF players
Ice hockey players at the 2002 Winter Olympics
Medalists at the 2002 Winter Olympics
National Hockey League All-Stars
NCAA men's ice hockey national champions
North Dakota Fighting Hawks men's ice hockey players
Olympic gold medalists for Canada
Olympic ice hockey players of Canada
Olympic medalists in ice hockey
People from Carman, Manitoba
Saginaw Hawks players
San Jose Sharks players
St. Louis Blues coaches
Stanley Cup champions
Toronto Maple Leafs players
Undrafted National Hockey League players
Vezina Trophy winners
William M. Jennings Trophy winners
Winkler Flyers players
AHCA Division I men's ice hockey All-Americans
Canadian expatriate ice hockey players in the United States